Pasquale Luiso (born 30 October 1969) is an Italian football coach and former player who works as youth coach of Juve Stabia. A forward, he notably reached the semi-finals of the UEFA Cup Winners' Cup with Vicenza.

Playing career
Luiso was born in Naples, Italy. He spent several years in amateur leagues, before he was picked up by Torino in 1994. Playing just one game for the club, he was loaned out to Pescara, before being sold to Chievo, who in turn loaned him out to Avellino, where a successful 1995–96 season saw him being picked up by Serie A minnows Piacenza.

During Luiso's only season at Piacenza he was a revelation in the top flight, netting 14 goals, among them a winning goal against reigning champions Milan. Piacenza beat Cagliari in a relegation playoff, which was a successful end for Luiso at the club, since he was bought by Coppa Italia winners Vicenza. During a four-year stint with the club, save for a short stint at Pescara. In total, Luiso struck 24 league goals for Vicenza, but was relegated twice with the club. He did, however, help the team to the semi-finals of the UEFA Cup Winners' Cup during his first season with the club, finishing the competition as the top scorer, also later helping Vicenza to re-obtain Serie A promotion by winning the 1999–2000 Serie B title.

Following the second relegation, Sampdoria signed Luiso, who scored 13 goals in 47 Serie B fixtures for the club. Prior to Sampdoria's promotion season, Luiso was sold to Ancona, where he contributed to their promotion instead, even though he spent the spring on loan at Salernitana. Following a mere three Serie A fixtures in Ancona's disastrous season, before a short spell at Catanzaro in 2004 signed the end of Luiso's professional career.

Following Catanzaro, Luiso spent some time playing for former club Sora, among other amateur clubs, prior to retiring aged 39, in 2008.

Managerial career
Luiso served as the head coach of Sora in the Italian Eccellenza division from 2010 to December 2011. He then briefly served in 2018 as head coach of Serie C club Racing Fondi.

In June 2022, Luiso took a role as youth coach of Juve Stabia.

Honours
Vicenza
Serie B: 1999–2000

Individual
UEFA Cup Winners' Cup Top Scorer: 1997–98

External links
 Pasquale Luiso - Calciatori.com

References

Living people
1969 births
Italian footballers
Footballers from Naples
Association football forwards
Serie A players
Serie B players
Serie C players
A.C. Ancona players
U.S. Avellino 1912 players
U.S. Catanzaro 1929 players
Delfino Pescara 1936 players
Piacenza Calcio 1919 players
U.S. Salernitana 1919 players
U.C. Sampdoria players
Torino F.C. players
L.R. Vicenza players
S.S. Teramo Calcio players
Italian football managers